ProofPilot is an American internet company with offices in New York City. ProofPilot is a Digital Protocol Automation platform that eliminates guesswork and protocol deviations to create high-performance experiences for sites and patients. Chris Venezia joined as the chief executive officer in 2022.

History 
ProofPilot grew out of the consulting firm Cyclogram in 2013. Matthew Amsden, started Cyclogram in 2005.

Early versions of the platform supported studies in the United States, Brazil and Peru. ProofPilot participated in the BluePrint Health Incubator program in the winter of 2014.

Amsden has talked about the challenges of creating a digital health startup and the cultural disconnect between buyers and VC-backed startups. He says that the typical venture-backed startup rule book almost killed ProofPilot. The company relaunched the product in late 2017 after not taking on customers for nearly 30 months.

Model 
The ProofPilot platform is split in three parts. The first gives users the ability to design research studies. The design process (and resulting participant experience) is based on a concept called micro-interactions. Non-experienced study designers can use study templates and fill in the blanks to create a study. The second is the participant experience. Study designers launch the study, it goes through an automatic external regulatory review by Veritas IRB in Montreal, Quebec, Canada. Then participants begin engaging in the study via mobile phones and desktop computers. ProofPilot has publicly stated it has deprioritized development of a native iOS and Android application because Progressive web apps provide a better user experience. The system also provides reporting of findings.

Regulatory and ethics review 
In September 2016, ProofPilot formed a partnership with Veritas IRB in Montreal, Quebec, Canada. Given that many of its customers are not academic institutions and don't have an in house review process, all studies launched on ProofPilot will be reviewed by Veritas before going live.

See also 
 Klick Health
 Medidata Solutions

References

External links 
 

Software companies based in New York (state)
Software companies of the United States